The 1933 Liverpool Exchange by-election was a by-election held for the British House of Commons constituency of Liverpool Exchange in Liverpool on 19 January 1933.  It was won by the Conservative Party candidate John Shute.

Vacancy 
The seat had become vacant on 12 December 1932 when the Conservative Member of Parliament (MP), Sir James Reynolds died at the age of 67. He had held the seat since the 1929 general election.

Candidates 
The Conservative candidate was 60-year-old John Shute, who had not previously contested a parliamentary election. The Labour Party selected Sydney Silverman, a 37-year-old solicitor who had been imprisoned as a conscientious objector during World War I. The Liberal Party had not contested the seat for many years and did not field a candidate in the by-election.

Result 
On a reduced turnout, the result was a victory for the Conservative candidate, John Shute, with 55% of the votes, a majority significantly below that of his predecessor in 1929. He held the seat until defeat at the 1945 general election.

Silverman was elected in 1935 as MP for Nelson and Colne.

Votes

See also
Liverpool Exchange (UK Parliament constituency)
1887 Liverpool Exchange by-election
1897 Liverpool Exchange by-election
1922 Liverpool Exchange by-election
Liverpool
List of United Kingdom by-elections

References 

Exchange 1933
Liverpool Exchange by-election
Liverpool Exchange by-election
1930s in Liverpool
Liverpool Exchange by-election